"Let My Love Be Your Pillow" is a song written by John Schweers, and recorded by American country music artist Ronnie Milsap.  It was released in November 1976 as the first single from the album Ronnie Milsap Live.  The song was Milsap's seventh number one on the country chart.  The single stayed at number one for one week and spent a total of twelve weeks on the chart.

Charts

Weekly charts

Year-end charts

References

1976 singles
1976 songs
Ronnie Milsap songs
RCA Records singles
Songs written by John Schweers
Song recordings produced by Tom Collins (record producer)